Huntington County is a county in the U.S. state of Indiana. According to the 2020 United States Census, the population was 36,662. The county seat (and only city) is Huntington.

Huntington County comprises the Huntington, Indiana micropolitan statistical area and is included in the Fort Wayne–Huntington–Auburn Combined Statistical Area.

History

Huntington County was organized from the previously unorganized Indiana Territory and lands gained by the Adams New Purchase of 1818. The county's creation was authorized by an act of the Indiana state legislature dated 2 February 1832. Organization of the county's governing structure began on 5 May 1834. The first non–Native American settlers in what has since become Huntington County were a group of 29 farm families from Connecticut who arrived in the early 1830s. These were "Yankee" settlers, meaning they were descended from the English Puritans who settled New England in the colonial era. These settlers were able to get to what has since become Huntington County due to the construction of the Wabash and Erie Canal, which was a shipping canal that connected the Great Lakes to the Ohio River by way of a manmade waterway. When they arrived in what has since become Huntington County, the settlers from Connecticut found dense virgin forest and wild prairie. The original 29 "Yankee" families from Connecticut laid out roads; built a post office; established post routes; and built a town hall, a church, and a schoolhouse from the trees in the area that they cut down. The county was named for Samuel Huntington, who signed the Declaration of Independence and the Articles of Confederation. He was also president of the Continental Congress under the Articles of Confederation.

Geography
The terrain of Huntington County consists of low rolling hills, completely devoted to agriculture or urban development. The Wabash River flows to the west through the upper-central part of the county, while the Salamonie River flows to the west through the lower part. Its highest point (about 925 feet (282 m) above sea level) is at the southwest corner.

Adjacent counties

 Whitley County – north
 Allen County – northeast
 Wells County – east
 Grant County – south
 Wabash County – west

Highways

  Interstate 69
  U.S. Route 24
  U.S. Route 224
  State Road 3
  State Road 5
  State Road 9
  State Road 16
  State Road 105
  State Road 114
  State Road 116
  State Road 124
  State Road 218

City and towns

 Andrews
 Banquo
 Bippus
 Goblesville
 Huntington (city)
 Lancaster
 Majenica
 Markle (partial)
 Monument City
 Mount Etna
 Plum Tree
 Roanoke
 Warren

Townships

 Clear Creek
 Dallas
 Huntington
 Jackson
 Jefferson
 Lancaster
 Polk
 Rock Creek
 Salamonie
 Union
 Warren
 Wayne

Unincorporated communities

 Banquo
 Bippus
 Bowerstown
 Bracken
 Buckeye
 Goblesville
 Harlansburg
 Lancaster
 Mahon
 Majenica
 Makin
 Mardenis
 Milo
 Pleasant Plain
 Plum Tree
 Roanoke Station
 Rock Creek Center
 Simpson

Protected areas
 JE Roush Fish and Wildlife Area
 Lost Bridge State Recreation Area

Notable people

Public servants
 Samuel E. Cook (1860–1946), U.S. congressman
 J. Danforth Quayle, U.S. representative, senator, vice-president
 J. Edward Roush (1920–2004), U.S. representative, father of "911"
 John R. Kissinger (1877–1946), early malaria test subject
Elizebeth (Smith) Friedman (1892–1980), author and pioneer in cryptology during WWI to WWII era, called "America's first female cryptanalyst"

Celebrities
 Chris Schenkel (1923–2005), sportscaster
 Archbishop John F. Noll (1875–1956), founded Catholic newspaper Our Sunday Visitor, founded Victory Noll and St. Felix Monastery.
 Sandy Thomson, chief weather specialist, WANE-TV Fort Wayne

Artists
 Mick Mars, guitarist for Mötley Crüe.
 Eiffel G. Plasterer (fl. 1950s), pioneer in soap bubble art

Athletes
 Gary Dilley, Tokyo Olympics swimmer
 George Haines, Olympic Women's Swim coach
 Glen S. Hummer, Tokyo Olympics Men's Swim coach
 W.L. Seibold, national horseshoe champion
 Mark Seibold, World horseshoe champion (1966, 1969, 1979, 1986)
 Ned Steele, 1938 national Ping Pong champion.
 Steve Platt, basketball player and former coach at Huntington University. Indiana's all-time collegiate scoring leader (3,700 points), placing him seventh on the list of all-time collegiate scorers at any level. Led the nation in scoring (1973, 1974).
 Lisa Winter, basketball player at Ball State University and Valparaiso University. Indiana's Miss Basketball 1996.
 Matt Pike, football player at Purdue University and in the Arena Football League, 1999–Present. Won AF2 Title with Peoria in 2002.
 Chris Kramer, professional basketball player. Kramer played college basketball at Purdue University where he was two-time Big Ten Defensive Player of the Year.

Points of interest

 Huntington County Historical Museum
 Huntington University Arboretum and Botanical Garden
 Huntington University
 J. Edward Roush Lake
 Joseph Decuis Restaurant
 Merillat Centre for the Arts
 Our Sunday Visitor Corporate Headquarters
 Sheets Wildlife Museum and Learning Center
 Sunken Gardens
 The Forks Of The Wabash
 The Indiana Room Genealogy Center
 Tel-Hy Nature Preserve
 Two-EE's Winery
 United States Vice Presidential Museum
 Victory Noll Center

Education

School district 
 Huntington County Community School Corporation

Private schools
 Huntington Area Home Educators
 Huntington Catholic School

Higher education
 Huntington University

News and media

Newspapers 

 The Herald-Press daily newspaper
 The Huntington County TAB
 Warren Weekly
 HuntingtonFreePress
 Huntingtonian

Radio
 WBZQ 1300 AM
 Huntington North High School WVSH Viking Radio
 WQHU-LP Huntington University Radio WQHU 105.5-FM Forester Radio]

Climate and weather

Government

The county government is a constitutional body, and is granted specific powers by the Constitution of Indiana, and by the Indiana Code.

County Council: The fiscal branch of the county government; controls spending and revenue collection in the county. Representatives, elected to four-year terms from county districts, are responsible for setting salaries, the annual budget, and special spending. The council has limited authority to impose local taxes, in the form of an income and property tax that is subject to state level approval, excise taxes, and service taxes.

Board of Commissioners: The executive and legislative body of the county. The commissioners are elected county-wide to staggered four-year terms. One commissioner serves as president. The commissioners are charged with collecting revenue and managing the county government.

Court: The county maintains a small claims court that handles civil cases. The judge on the court is elected to a term of four years and must be a member of the Indiana Bar Association. The judge is assisted by a constable who is also elected to a four-year term. In some cases, court decisions can be appealed to the state level circuit court.

County Officials: The county has other elected offices, including sheriff, coroner, auditor, treasurer, recorder, surveyor, and circuit court clerk. These officers are elected to four-year terms. Members elected to county government positions are required to declare party affiliations and to be residents of the county.

Huntington County is part of Indiana's 3rd congressional district; Indiana Senate districts 17 and 19; and Indiana House of Representatives district 50.

Presidential Election Analysis: Huntington County has been strongly Republican; Lyndon B. Johnson was the last Democratic Party candidate to carry the county (1964).

Demographics

2010 census
As of the 2010 United States Census, there were 37,124 people, 14,218 households, and 10,074 families in the county. The racial makeup of the county was 97.1% white, 0.4% Asian, 0.4% American Indian, 0.4% black or African American, 0.5% from other races, and 1.1% from two or more races. Those of Hispanic or Latino origin made up 1.7% of the population. In terms of ancestry, 37.9% were German, 14.9% were Irish, 12.9% were American, and 12.1% were English.

Of the 14,218 households, 32.3% had children under the age of 18 living with them, 56.5% were married couples living together, 9.9% had a female householder with no husband present, 29.1% were non-families, and 24.4% of all households were made up of individuals. The average household size was 2.52 and the average family size was 2.97. The median age was 39.0 years.

The median income for a household in the county was $47,697 and the median income for a family was $55,630. Males had a median income of $41,648 versus $30,218 for females. The per capita income for the county was $21,575. About 7.7% of families and 11.4% of the population were below the poverty line, including 15.6% of those under age 18 and 9.8% of those age 65 or over.

See also
 National Register of Historic Places listings in Huntington County, Indiana

Further reading
 History of Huntington County, Indiana. Walsworth Publishing Co. (1887).

References

External links
 Huntington County Chamber of Commerce
 Official Web site of Huntington, Indiana
 Huntington County Community Network
 Huntington Herald Press daily newspaper
 Huntington County United Economic Development

 
Indiana counties
1832 establishments in Indiana
Populated places established in 1832
Fort Wayne, IN Metropolitan Statistical Area
Sundown towns in Indiana